General Davis Mwamunyange (born 1959) was the Chief of Defence Forces of the Tanzania People's Defence Force. He was appointed by the Tanzanian President Jakaya Kikwete in September 2007. Before his appointment he was the Chief of General Staff.

References

1959 births
Living people
Tanzanian generals